

Mihail Minciună (September 2, 1884 in Bogzeşti – February 4, 1935 in Bogzeşti) was a Bessarabian politician.

He served as Member of the Moldovan Parliament (1917–1918).

Gallery

Bibliography 
Gheorghe E. Cojocaru, Sfatul Țării: itinerar, Civitas, Chişinău, 1998,  
Mihai Taşcă, Sfatul Țării şi actualele autorităţi locale, "Timpul de dimineaţă", no. 114 (849), June 27, 2008 (page 16)

External links 
 Arhiva pentru Sfatul Tarii 
 Deputaţii Sfatului Ţării şi Lavrenti Beria

Notes

1884 births
People from Telenești District
Romanian people of Moldovan descent
1935 deaths
Moldovan MPs 1917–1918